Deficit reduction can refer to any method of reducing a government budget deficit (including reduced government spending and/or increased government revenue).

See also
Deficit (disambiguation)
Deficit Reduction Act (disambiguation)
Deficit reduction in the United States
United States Congress Joint Select Committee on Deficit Reduction

Deficit spending
Government spending
Tax